This is a List of Macedonian writers: notable Macedonian historians, philosophers, scientists, laboratory specialists, authors, and writers who were born in Macedonia or published in standard/dialectal Macedonian.

Note: This list is incomplete.

A
 Gjorgji Abadžiev (1910-1963)
 Kosta Abraš (1879-1898), poet.
 Stojan Andov (born 1935)
 Petre M. Andreevski (1934-2006)
 Maja Apostoloska (born 1976)
 Venko Andonovski (born 1964)

B
 Rumena Bužarovska (born 1981)

C / Č

 Dimitrija Čupovski (1878–1940)
 Kole Čašule (1921-2009)
 Živko Čingo (1935-1987)
 Ivan Čapovski (1936-)

D
 Igor Džambazov (born 1963)
 Dimitar Dimitrov (born 1937)
 Lidija Dimkovska (born 1971)
 Petre Dimovski

G / Ǵ
 Bogomil Gjuzel (born 1939)

H
 Stojan Hristov (1898-1996)

I
 Vasil Iljoski (1902-1995)

J
 Meto Jovanovski (born 1928)
 Slavko Janevski (1920-2000)
 Irena Jordanova (born 1980)
 Mišo Juzmeski (born 1966)

K / Ḱ
 Risto Krle (1900-1975)
 Risto Kirjazovski (1927–2002)
 Aco Karamanov (1927-1944)
 Blaže Koneski (1921-1993)

M

 Vlado Maleski (1919-1984)
 Stefan Markovski (born 1990)
 Krste Misirkov (1874–1926)

N
 Kole Nedelkovski (1921-1941)

P

 Georgi Pulevski(1817–1895)
 Mihail Petrusevski (1911–1990)
 Anton Panov (1906-1967)
 Božin Pavlovski (born 1942)
 Pande Petrovski (1943-2006) General

R

 Blaže Ristovski (born 1931)
 Kočo Racin (1908-1943)

S/Š
 Aco Šopov (1923-1982), poet and translator.
 Goce Smilevski (born 1975), prose writer.
 Luan Starova (born 1941)

T
 Gane Todorovski (1929–2010)
 Zoran T. Popovski (born 1962)
 Jovica Tasevski-Eternijan (born 1976)

Notes

Macedonian language
Macedonian
List